Hermann Bek-Gran (September 20, 1869 – July 9, 1909) was a German-Jewish painter, graphic artist, typographer, and university professor.

Hermann Bek-Gran (née Bek) was born on September 20, 1869, in Mainz, Germany. He was the son of Karl von Beck and Marie Magdalene Auguste Beck (née Grann). He was educated at the Kunstgewerbeschule Nürnberg (School of Applied Arts, Nuremberg), and later enrolled at the Königlichen Kunstakademie in München (Royal Arts Academy, Munich) in nature classes on October 21, 1889.

After university Bek-Gran worked as a freelance artist in Munich painting nature, portrait, and slice of life scenes. He also painted commercial graphics, posters, and ex libris. In 1902 Bek-Gran was a founding member of Der Bund Zeichnender Künstler in München. Hermann maintained guest status with the Hagenbund. In 1905, Hermann was appointed professor of hand-drawing at the School of Applied Arts, Nuremberg. He created the Bek-Gran font for the D. Stempel Type Foundry in 1906.

In his personal life, Hermann married Marie Maison, together they had three children. Early in his career Hermann changed his last name from Bek to Bek-Gran (sometimes stylized Bekgran), adding his mother's maiden name as a hyphenate. He died on July 9, 1909, in Nuremberg, Germany

References

Jewish painters
1869 births
1909 deaths
19th-century German Jews
German male painters
19th-century German painters
19th-century German male artists
20th-century German painters
20th-century German male artists
Artists from Mainz
Academy of Fine Arts, Munich alumni
Academy of Fine Arts, Nuremberg alumni
Academic staff of the Academy of Fine Arts, Nuremberg
Bookplate designers
German portrait painters
German poster artists